The list of Nintendo Game Boy Color games includes  licensed releases from the platform's launch in 1998 to the final release in 2003. The last official release for the system was Doraemon no Study Boy: Kanji Yomikaki Master, which was released in Japan on July 18, 2003. However, multiple unlicensed games (many of which are developed and distributed by fans) have been released since then. Additionally, there were several games which were developed and officially licensed, but were cancelled before release.

Games were released under two classes of cartridges: Class A, "Dual Mode" cartridges compatible with Game Boy systems which predate the Game Boy Color. They feature the text "Yes" in the column indicating two versions of the game included on the cartridges. The backs of the boxes for such games are labeled "Compatible with Game Boy" and the cartridges of these games are typically molded in black to distinguish them from original Game Boy cartridges. Many of them also have special borders and/or limited color support for the Super Game Boy. Class B cartridges were compatible only with the Game Boy Color, Game Boy Advance, Game Boy Advance SP and Game Boy Player. They feature the text "No" in the column indicating backward compatibility. Such games typically feature the disclaimers "Only for Game Boy Color" and "Not compatible with other Game Boy systems!" on their box art or sometimes on the cartridge.

This list is organized alphabetically by the games' localized English titles, or by rōmaji transliterations when exclusive to Japan. The releases are sorted into 3 main regions (Japan, North America, and European Union/ PAL region), specifying if certain European games had country-specific distribution. There is also one game exclusive to the country of South Korea. Information about developers, publishers, and release dates are gathered from the GameFAQs and Moby Games websites.

Licensed games (released)

Regions

List of games

Games exclusive to Nintendo Power cartridge peripheral 
Several games were released only digitally through the Japanese exclusive Nintendo Power Game Boy peripheral.

Cancelled games 
There were a total of 58 games which were officially licensed by Nintendo and were developed, but were cancelled before release.

The information in this section is provided primarily through the GameFAQs website database "advanced search" option.

This section is under construction.

Unlicensed games 
Several unlicensed games were released for the Game Boy Color. Almost all are backwards compatible with older Game Boy systems. Titles consist of Christian video games as well as counterfeit games based on popular franchises. In addition to these, several fan-made games were developed and distributed through unofficial channels.

There are currently  unlicensed games listed below.

See also 
 Lists of video games
 Lists of Game Boy games
 List of Game Boy games
 List of Game Boy Advance games
 List of Super Game Boy games

Notes

References 
 Game Boy Color games list at Nintendo.com

Game Boy Color
Game Boy Color